This is a list of settlement houses in Chicago.

Settlement houses, which reached their peak popularity in the early 20th century, were marked by a residential approach to social work: the social workers ("residents") would live in the settlement house, and thus be a part of the same communities as the people they served. The movement began in England in 1884 but quickly spread; the first settlement house in Chicago was Hull House, founded in 1889.

By 1911, Chicago's neighborhoods boasted dozens of settlement houses, but in the course of the 20th century most of these closed.  Some, however, remain in operation as social service agencies today, although most no longer follow the residential model.  Some also merged into other organizations; for example, the Chicago Commons Association absorbed a number of settlement houses including Chicago Commons itself, the Olivet Institute, and the University of Chicago Settlement.  Modern-day institutions that are or once were settlement houses include the Northwestern University Settlement House on the Near North Side and Benton House in Bridgeport.

The scope of this list includes any institution in Chicago that functioned as a settlement house at one time, even if it subsequently ceased to follow the settlements' residential model.  Some addresses are based on sources prior to the 1910s, and may thus reflect older street-numbering systems and not correspond to the address the structure would have today.

List

Works cited

See also
Settlement house

References

Further reading
Encyclopedia of Chicago: Settlement houses

External links
Guide to the University of Chicago Settlement Records 1897-1977 at the University of Chicago Special Collections Research Center

Chicago
Settlement houses, list of
Settlement houses